Dark Waters is the seventh studio album by the Dutch symphonic metal band Delain. It was released on 10 February 2023 via Napalm Records.

It is the first studio album to feature Diana Leah on vocals and Ludovico Cioffi on bass guitar. The album also marks the return of original guitarist Ronald Landa and drummer Sander Zoer.

Background
On 15 February 2021, it was announced that Delain's lineup had split up, and that it would be continuing with a new lineup that Westerholt stated would continue to "keep Delain alive", which consists of new and previous members.

The band's new lineup was fully announced on the release of the first single, "The Quest and the Curse", on 9 August 2022, as well as announcing their new lead vocalist, Diana Leah. The second single, "Beneath", was released on 29 November 2022. Simultaneously on the same day of the single's release, the band announced the title of their upcoming seventh studio album, Dark Waters, with a release date of 10 February 2023. The third single, "Moth to a Flame", was released on 10 January 2023.

Track listing

Notes
 The digisleeve and limited box editions feature a second disc, containing the instrumental versions of the first disc.
 The limited box edition features a third disc, containing orchestral versions of "Tainted Hearts", "The Cold", "Invictus" and "Underland".

Personnel
All information from the album booklet.

Delain
 Martijn Westerholt – keyboards, backing vocals, songwriting
 Sander Zoer – drums
 Ronald Landa – guitars, backing vocals, harsh vocals
 Ludovico Cioffi – bass guitar, backing vocals, harsh vocals
 Diana Leah – lead vocals

Additional musicians
 Rob van der Loo – bass guitar
 Marko Hietala – guest vocals on "Invictus"
 Paolo Ribaldini – guest vocals (tracks 3, 8, 9)
 Ruud Jolie – guitar on "Mirror of Night"
 Mikko P. Mustonen – orchestrations

Production
 Jacob Hansen – mixing
 Svante Forsbäck – mastering
 Robin la Joy – lyrics
 Guus Eikens – songwriting

Charts

References 

Delain albums
2023 albums
Napalm Records albums